Nicholas Jeremy Josef Smith (born 1972) is an Australian philosopher and Professor of Philosophy at the University of Sydney.
He is a fellow of the Australian Academy of the Humanities and a former President of the Australasian Association for Logic.
Smith is known for his research on logics. He is a lecturer for the popular PHIL1012: Introductory Logic course at the University of Sydney, which broke records in 2021 as the largest course by enrolments in the Faculty of Arts and Social Sciences.

Books
Logic: The Laws of Truth, Princeton University Press, 2012
Vagueness and Degrees of Truth, Oxford University Press, 2008

See also
Temporal paradox
Grandfather paradox
Time travel

References

External links
 Nick Smith at the University of Sydney

Australian philosophers
Analytic philosophers
Philosophy academics
Living people
Academic staff of the University of Sydney
University of Sydney alumni
1972 births
Philosophers of language
Australian logicians